Justice Shekhar Kumar Yadav (16 April 1964) is an Indian judge who is serving currently in the Allahabad High Court since 12 December 2019.

Contentious comments 
Yadav is known to opine things that are a departure from the standard norms of the Judiciary of India such as—

References 

Indian judges
21st-century Indian judges
Kaushambi district
Judges of the Allahabad High Court
1964 births
Living people